4300 may refer to:

 IBM 4300 mainframe computer
 NS 4300 steam locomotives
 GWR 4300 Class steam locomotives
 Autolite 4300 carburetor
 The last year of the 43rd century